Jordan Thompson (born July 12, 1989) is a former American football tight end. He played college football at Ohio University and attended Parkway High School in Rockford, Ohio. He has been a member of the Detroit Lions of the National Football League.

College career
Thompson played for the Ohio Bobcats from 2009 to 2012. He was redshirted in 2008.

Professional career
Thompson was rated the 54th best tight end in the 2013 NFL Draft by NFLDraftScout.com.

Thompson was signed by the Detroit Lions on April 28, 2014. He was released by the Lions on August 30, 2014, and signed to the team's practice squad on September 1, 2014. He made his NFL debut on October 19, 2014, against the New Orleans Saints. He was released by the Lions on May 4, 2016.

He participated in The Spring League in 2017.

Life after football
Thompson is now a carpenter on the HGTV show, While You Were Out.

References

Living people
1989 births
American football tight ends
Ohio Bobcats football players
Detroit Lions players
Players of American football from Ohio
People from Mercer County, Ohio
The Spring League players